Love at First Sight is a studio album by American singer Dionne Warwick released in 1977 by Warner Bros. Records.

Overview 
The album was produced by Michael Omartian and Steve Barri. The sound of the longplay resembled the previous works of the artist in the Scepter Records period. The track “Early Morning Strangers," was co-written by Hal David, who co-wrote Warwick's '60s and early-'70s hit classics with Burt Bacharach. “Early Morning Strangers” had music by Barry Manilow who would produce her first Arista album in 1979. 

The album failed to chart and was Warwick's last album with Warner Bros. The next album would be released on Arista Records.

Track listing

References

External links
 

Dionne Warwick albums
1977 albums
Albums arranged by Michael Omartian
Albums produced by Michael Omartian
Albums produced by Steve Barri
Warner Records albums